"No Alibis" is a track from Eric Clapton's 1989 album Journeyman. It was released as a single in a shortened version, with "Running on Faith" (also on the Journeyman album) as the B-side. The 12" single and CD maxi-singles, both released the following year, included the longer album version and also added live versions of "Behind the Mask" and "Cocaine", respectively. The live versions were recorded at the National Exhibition Centre in Birmingham, England in July 1986.

"No Alibis" is one of the more commercial rock songs from that record. Author Marc Roberty describes it as "a strong, anthem-like song." The song, written by longtime collaborator Jerry Lynn Williams, combines Clapton's rough, seasoned vocals with guest vocalist Daryl Hall's light vocals. The lyrics are about a man asking his girlfriend or wife not to lie to him further, suggesting that all the lies she tells make the situation worse. During the Journeyman World Tour, performances of this song were particularly energetic. It became a live favorite.

In Clapton's autobiography, he describes that he wrote the songs with Williams, who was credited exclusively, but that Clapton was betrayed by his former partner Lory Del Santo.

The single release of the song reached number 53 on the British charts and stayed there for three weeks. On the US charts, the single reached number 4 on the mainstream rock charts, though it did not enter the Hot 100.

Personnel
 Eric Clapton – lead vocals, guitar 
 Greg Phillinganes – keyboards, backing vocals
 Richard Tee – acoustic piano
 Robbie Kondor – synthesizer programming
 Nathan East – bass, backing vocals
 Jimmy Bralower – drum programming 
 Carol Steele – percussion 
 Daryl Hall – harmony vocals 
 Chaka Khan – backing vocals
 Lani Groves – backing vocals

Notes 

1990 singles
Eric Clapton songs
Songs written by Jerry Lynn Williams
Song recordings produced by Russ Titelman
1989 songs
Reprise Records singles